Distributed Ruby or DRb allows Ruby programs to communicate with each other on the same machine or over a network. DRb uses remote method invocation (RMI) to pass commands and data between processes.

See also 
 Java remote method invocation
 Rinda (Ruby programming language)

External links 
 DRb RDoc Documentation

Ruby (programming language)
Inter-process communication